Anolis transversalis, the  banded tree anole or transverse anole, is a species of lizard in the family Dactyloidae. The species is found in Venezuela, Ecuador, Peru, Colombia, Brazil, and Bolivia.

References

Anoles
Reptiles of Venezuela
Reptiles of Colombia
Reptiles of Peru
Reptiles of Brazil
Reptiles of Ecuador
Reptiles of Bolivia
Reptiles described in 1851
Taxa named by Auguste Duméril